Lasso (born Andrés Vicente de Jesús Lazo Uslar on 18 February 1988), is a Venezuelan singer / composer.

Solo career
2009, Lasso, started working on his first album with Francisco Díaz, producer of Desorden Público, to produce and mix his album. This process started at Sonofolk, a music studio, between October 2009 and June 2010, and came out with twelve songs. Once he finished recording the album, Lasso had the chance to hire Brian Gardner to master and finish the album in Los Angeles. When designing the album's artwork, he decided he would change his name to Lasso to pay homage to a Phoenix song of the same name he really enjoyed.

The music genre of this album is pop rock, but there are also influences of Latin rhythms like reggae and European rhythms like Flamenco.

After many months, Lasso returned to Venezuela with his first single "No Pares de Bailar", from his album Sin Otro Sentido. This album was launched in March 2011 and Recordland in charge of the national distribution. His single "Te Veo", became a number one hit in Venezuela, South America.

In 2015 he moved to Mexico City to continue expanding his audience and musical career. There he launched his album "El Exilio Voluntario de una Mente Saturada" and his two recent singles "Un Millon Como Tu", in collaboration with Chilean-born Camila Gallardo, and "Souvenir" and the new song “Subtítulos” with Danna Paola released on September 27, 2019.

First single

The launch of his first single, "No Pares de Bailar", came with a music video filmed in November 2010. The producer was Paolo Merlini, Carolina Uslar as art director, and Rodolfo Bear as a photographer.

"No Pares de Bailar" was a Top #1 in HTV and his album Sin otro sentido became a top seller at the popular Venezuelan music stores Recordland for many weeks.

Awards 
Lasso was named Debut Artist of the Year at the 2012 Pepsi Venezuela Music Awards, and Pop Artist of the Year in 2013.

Personal life 
In 2011, he confirmed he was in a romantic relationship with actress and singer Sheryl Rubio, with whom he maintained a relationship until September 2018.

Discography

References

External links 
 
 E! Entertainment Television Latin America
 Animax Latin America

Living people
Venezuelan composers
Male composers
1988 births
21st-century composers
21st-century Venezuelan  male singers
Singers from Caracas